Rhodri James Alban Thomas (born 13 March 1942) is a Welsh former first-class cricketer.

Thomas was born at St Dogmaels, Pembrokeshire. He was educated at Radley College, before going up to Corpus Christi College, Oxford. While studying at Oxford, he played first-class cricket for Oxford University, making his debut against Warwickshire at Oxford in 1963. He played first-class cricket for Oxford until 1965, making a total of fifteen appearances. He scored a total of 622 runs in his fifteen first-class matches, at an average of 23.92 and with a high score of 135 not out. This score, which was his only first-class century, came against Northamptonshire in a high scoring match in 1963, which also saw Northamptonshire's Roger Prideaux score a double century.

References

External links

1942 births
Living people
Cricketers from Pembrokeshire
People educated at Radley College
Alumni of Corpus Christi College, Oxford
Welsh cricketers
Oxford University cricketers